Cambodian Son is a 2014 documentary film about the journey of Kosal Khiev from prisoner in America to world-class poet in Cambodia.

The documentary follows Kosal's life after receiving the most important performance invitation of his career—to represent the Kingdom of Cambodia at the London 2012 Cultural Olympiad. Kosal would travel to London having only taken two flights prior; first, as a one-year-old refugee child whose family fled Cambodia and then as a 32-year-old criminal "alien" forcibly returned to Cambodia in 2011. This documentary follows a volatile yet charming and talented young man who struggles to find his footing amongst a new freedom that was granted only through his deportation.

Kosal's London representation is a triumphant moment for many people in his life, both in America and Cambodia. The film traces the impact and significance of this moment for Kosal, his friends, family, mentors and a growing international fan base. Armed only with memorized verses, he must face the challenges of being a deportee while navigating his new fame as Phnom Penh’s premiere poet.

The local buzz and excitement increases as Kosal’s friends begin to pull together a send off party fit for a king. As the pressure to perform and represent builds, Kosal begins to deteriorate. A dramatic series of events nearly prohibits him from ever stepping onto the London stage. From teaching literacy at a Cambodian dumpsite to performing at the London 2012 Cultural Olympiad, Kosal soon realizes with his new freedom comes great responsibility.

After the performances end and the London stage becomes a faint memory, Kosal is once again left alone to answer the central question in his life: "How do you survive when you belong nowhere?"

Reception
One reviewer said that the film is, "a compelling, thought-provoking documentary that raises important questions about the power of art to change lives and the power of the current immigration laws to ruin them."

References

External links
 IMDb entry

2014 films
Documentary films about poets
Films shot in Cambodia
2014 documentary films
Cambodian documentary films
2010s English-language films